Gábor Görgey (born Artúr Görgey; 22 November 1929 – 11 April 2022) was a Hungarian writer, poet, director and politician, who served as Minister of Culture between 2002 and 2003. He was a descendant of the freedom fighter General Artúr Görgey who served as Minister of War during the Hungarian Revolution of 1848. He died on 11 April 2022, at the age of 92.

Honours
 Graves Prize (1976)
 Attila József Prize (1980)
 Tibor Déry Award (1989)
 Book of the Year Award (2000)
 Pro urbe Budapest (2001)
 Gold Pen (2005)
 Kossuth Prize (2006)

Works
 Füst és fény (poems, 1956)
 Délkör (poems, 1963)
 Köszönöm, jól (poems, 1970)
 Alacsony az Ararát (plays, 1971)
 Légifolyosó (poems, 1977)
 Munkavilágítás (essays, 1984)
 A díva bosszúja (short stories, 1988)
 Nők szigete (poems, 1990)
 Mindig újabb kutyák jönnek (novel, 1991)
 Eszkimó nyár (poems, 1993)
 Utolsó jelentés Atlantiszról (novel, 2000)
 Volt egyszer egy Felvidék! (novel, 1989) Magvető Kiadó, Budapest, 1989.

His first drama, the Komámasszony, hol a stukker? brought significant successes. It was shown in the United States too.

References

 Tanulmány Görgey Gábor művészetéről
 Görgey Gábor életrajza a gondola.hu-n

1929 births
2022 deaths
Culture ministers of Hungary
Education ministers of Hungary
Hungarian journalists
Hungarian male poets
Members of the European Academy of Sciences and Arts
20th-century Hungarian poets
20th-century Hungarian male writers
Attila József Prize recipients
Writers from Budapest